Habitat Jam was a massive online event organized by the United Nations Human Settlements Programme (UN-HABITAT), the Government of Canada and IBM. It was held on December 1-4 2005 to help solve urgent problems of the world's cities. 

Habitat Jam was conceived to set the stage for the World Urban Forum 3 conference, which was held in Vancouver in June 2006. Ideas collected through the Jam were used to define themes and shape discussion topics for delegates attending the conference. Participation in Habitat Jam was open to public and private-sector organizations and individuals around the world with an interest in urban issues.

Third Session of the World Urban Forum and the role of Habitat Jam 

Within the next 50 years, two-thirds of the world's population will live in urban areas. As these cities expand, the world community faces the challenge of minimizing the growing poverty crisis and improving the urban poor's access to basic facilities, such as shelter, clean water and sanitation. World Urban Forum 3 (WUF 3) will bring together thousands of the world's best thinkers on urbanization — experts, decision makers and members of public and private institutions — to zero in on solutions to these key 21st century challenges. 

Recognizing that a limited number of individuals can participate in the physical conference in Vancouver, the sponsors looked for a way to engage the world in a conversation about the future of our cities. They met with IBM, and the result was Habitat Jam, which incorporated six forums focused on the following themes:

Improving the lives of people living in slums 
Sustainable access to water in our cities 
Environmental sustainability in our cities 
Finance and governance in our cities 
Safety and security in our cities 
Humanity: the future of our cities

The Jam solution 

IBM provided an Internet-based, collaborative environment that could accommodate up to 100,000 participants worldwide. The IBM team customized the Jam application, hosted Habitat Jam, provided advice and guidance to the World Urban Forum organization, analyzed the data collected, participated at the conference, and assisted in public relations and marketing activities. IBM had used online Jams internally since 2001 to enable global collaboration among IBMers. IBM's home-grown Jams are one of the business world's prime examples of collaborative innovation.

About UN-HABITAT 
 
UN-HABITAT is the United Nations agency for human settlements. It is mandated by the UN General Assembly to promote socially and environmentally sustainable towns and cities, with the goal of providing adequate shelter for all.

See also

 Habitat I

External links 
  Habitat Jam Exhibit on Global Dialogue Center
 Junxion Strategy case study with promotional information used for the Habitat Jam
 Story of Habitat Jam in Backbone Magazine
 There is a podcast episode that originated at IBM's investor website called IBM and the Future of Our Cities which includes an interview with Charles Kelly, Commissioner General of the World Urban Forum 3 and Mike Wing of IBM Strategic Communications.

Social networks for social change